Lists of Gladiators events cover episodes from the Gladiators TV franchise, which had local versions in several countries during the 1990s and early 2000s.
The lists are organized by country.

Lists

 List of Gladiators UK events
 List of American Gladiators events